The 1998 Winter Olympics flu epidemic was a flu outbreak that occurred during the 1998 Winter Olympics in Nagano, Japan.

The outbreak
The flu outbreak spread across Japan, with many schools across the country being closed. Then-Prime Minister Ryutaro Hashimoto's wife, Kumiko, was hospitalized with the virus. Nearly 900,000 people became ill and at least 20 people, including 17 schoolchildren and three elderly people, died due to the flu virus. Many athletes withdrew because of the flu, including Alexei Yagudin, who was infected.

References

flu
1998 in Japanese sport
1998 disease outbreaks
Influenza pandemics
Disease outbreaks in Japan
20th-century epidemics